The NATO Response Force (NRF) is a high-readiness force comprising land, air, sea and special forces units capable of being deployed quickly. Until February 2022, when NATO activated it in response to Russia's invasion of Ukraine, units assigned to the NRF had only been used to assist with disaster relief and security at high-profile security events. On 25 February 2022 after a NATO meeting, the Very High Readiness Joint Task Force (VJTF) was activated for the defense of members of the alliance, for the first time.

Rotating forces through the NRF requires nations to meet the demanding standards needed for collective defence and expeditionary operations. As the standards are very high, participation in the NRF is preceded by a six-month NATO exercise program in order to integrate and standardize the various national contingents. Generally, nations carry out a pre-training period in preparation for the NATO exercises of between 6–18 months. Once activated, Reconnaissance Teams deploy within 5 days. This is the first of a number of deployment phases that lead to the deployment of the entire HQ Joint Task Force and Immediate Reaction Forces within 30 days.

The NRF currently comprises up to 40,000 troops and will be increased to over 300,000 troops. It includes units from several countries that do not belong to NATO: non-member partners, Finland, which first contributed forces in 2008; Sweden, 2013; Ukraine,  2014; and Georgia, 2015.

The NRF trains for various tasks, including:
 providing immediate collective defence of Alliance members in the event of an Article V operation;
 crisis management;
 acting as the initial force deployment as a precursor to deployment of a much larger force; 
 peace support;
 disaster relief; 
 protection of critical infrastructure.

Structure
The NRF structure consists of four parts:

Command and Control element: based on a deployable Joint Task Force HQ 

Very High Readiness Joint Task Force (VJTF)

Initial Follow On Forces Group: These are high-readiness forces that can deploy quickly following the VJTF, in response to a crisis

Response Forces Pool: NATO retains a broad spectrum of military capabilities encompassing command and control, combat and support units through the Responses Forces Pool (RFP). The forces are drawn from the much wider pool of Allied or Partners National deployable forces.

History

Creation and early years 
The NRF concept was first endorsed with a declaration of NATO's Heads of State at the Prague Summit on 22 November 2002 and approved by NATO Defence Ministers in June 2003. Dual headquarters were created in Naples, Italy and Brunssum, Netherlands; command rotates annually between them. In 2004 and 2005, NRF units were activated for a small number of civilian missions, including to provide security at the 2004 Summer Olympics in Athens and the Afghan presidential elections, as well as to provide humanitarian assistance in the United States after Hurricane Katrina and in Pakistan after the 2005 Kashmir earthquake. Due to equipment shortages, unfulfilled troop commitments and falling political support among member countries, the size of the NRF was cut in half in 2007 and not used again until 2022. During the 2014 Wales summit following the Crimean crisis, NATO leaders agreed to reorganize the NRF's core troops into a "spearhead force" known as a "Very High Readiness Joint Task Force" (VJTF) designed to be able to deploy at 48 hours notice, although the actual level of readiness was generally several weeks. It was also for the first time linked explicitly to NATO's Article 5 obligations. Altogether, it amounted to around 30,000 troops.

For most of its existence, the lack of enthusiasm of NATO's member states for the NRF resulted in chronic equipment and personnel shortages. It was sometimes branded a wasteful failure and an insignificant force next to NATO's more established units. Nevertheless, some military scholars argue that it played a significant role in modernizing European militaries as their troops rotated through it.

2022 Russian invasion of Ukraine 

As Russian troops built up around Ukraine in early 2022, various units attached to the NRF were alerted or deployed. On 11 February 2022, a U.S. Army brigade combat team of about 4,700 troops from the 82nd Airborne Division was ordered to Poland, while a Stryker squadron (battalion-sized cavalry unit) was sent from Vilseck's Rose Barracks to Romania.

On 16 February 2022, 8,500 troops in some of the units that make up the U.S. contribution to the NRF were put on alert for possible rotational deployment to EUCOM's area of responsibility. As of 25 February 2022 seven thousand soldiers of the 8500-troop tranche, including the 1st Armored Brigade Combat Team/3rd Infantry Division (1st ABCT/3rd ID —4700 troops, plus support units) deployed to Germany, initially. For the first time in decades, three US heavy brigades are deploying to EUCOM concurrently —(from the 1ABCT/3rd ID, the 1ABCT/1st ID, and an IBCT/82nd AB, all to be deployed as needed for the situation). Two forward-deployed headquarters, one from V Corps (United States), and the capability for one from XVIII Airborne Corps are now positioned in Poznan, Poland, and Wiesbaden, Germany respectively, should any further need arise for a proportionate response to a threat to the member states of NATO.

After a NATO meeting on 25 February 2022, NATO Secretary-General Jens Stoltenberg stated that the NATO leadership had agreed to deploy part of the NRF to alliance members in Eastern Europe. Stoltenberg said that Very High Readiness Joint Task Force, currently led by France, would be among the units sent. This was the first time the NRF had been activated. In light of the 2022 Russian invasion of Ukraine, the NATO Response Force can activate up to 40,000 troops. Eight of NATO's thirty member nations (as of 24 February 2022) have triggered urgent consultations under Article 4 of the NATO Washington Treaty. In advance of the 2022 Madrid summit, Jens Stoltenberg announced the plan to increase the NRF size to more than 300,000 troops, which was approved during the summit.

See also 
 Combined Joint Expeditionary Force (CJEF)
 Eurocorps
 Franco-German Brigade
 UK Joint Expeditionary Force

Notes

External links 

 Official Article on NATO Response Force
 critical NATO Review article
 Ukraine's MFA article
 NRF Factsheet
 The NATO Response Force – Facilitating coalition warfare through technology transfer and information sharing

NATO
Military units and formations established in 2003